The Benanain River is a river of western Timor, Indonesia. This river is the longest and the largest di the West Timor area, with a length of 132 km. The river is located in three regencies: Malaka, Timor Tengah Utara and Timor Tengah Selatan, province East Nusa Tenggara, Indonesia. The upstream rises from Mount Mutis, flowing in the southeast direction until discharging to Timor Sea near Besikama.

Hydrology 
The watershed (Indonesian: Daerah Aliran Sungai/DAS) of Benanain has an area of 3,158 km2 comprising Malaka, Timor Tengah Utara, Timor Tengah Selatan and also a small part of Belu Regency. It is the largest watershed in the East Nusa Tenggara province. The Benanain River has a characteristic of very extreme discharge fluctuation, giving the indication that the condition of this watershed is in a serious damage. Consequently, every year this river causes big flooding.

Tributaries 
Some of the largest tributaries of the river are:
 Baen River
 Biau River
 Asban River
 Okan River
 Muti River
 Bunu River
 Fatu River
 Laku River
 Besi River

Geography 
The river flows in the middle south of Timor with predominantly tropical savanna climate (designated as Aw in the Köppen-Geiger climate classification). The annual average temperature in the area is 26 °C. The warmest month is November, when the average temperature is around 29 °C, and the coldest is June, at 23 °C. The average annual rainfall is 1760 mm. The wettest month is January, with an average of 305 mm rainfall, and the driest is September, with 5 mm rainfall.

Uses 
The inhabitants along the Benanain River use the water for agriculture and fisheries by traditional fishing or using nets. The Benanain Dam in Kakaniuk village, district of Malaka Tengah, Malaka Regency, can distribute water to 15,000 hectare of farmlands. Other than agriculture, the dam is also used for flood prevention.

Ecology 
This river is a habitat of local crocodiles.

See also
List of rivers of Indonesia

References

Rivers of West Timor
Rivers of Timor
Rivers of Indonesia